No More Travelling Chess is an album created by Guy Manning and Andy Tillison whilst in band Gold Frankincense & Disk-drive. The album consisted of cover versions of pieces by Peter Hammill plus a couple of original pieces. The subsequent album was released as a Cassette version on private mail order before eventually being remastered and released in an extended CD format by Cyclops Records under the band name Parallel or 90 Degrees.

Track listing 
Van der Graaf Generator/Peter Hammill covers
 Arrow
 Roncevaux
 Flight
 Modern
 In The Black Room (Track added to original Cassette version)

P090/GF&DD Compositions
 Advance (Tillison)
 Evolutionary Status Quo (Manning)

Personnel 
Andy Tillison: drums, keyboards, vocals
Guy Manning: guitars, keyboards, vocals

2001 albums